Paya is a corregimiento in Pinogana District, Darién Province, Panama with a population of 639 as of 2010. Its population as of 1990 was 336; its population as of 2000 was 565.  It lies on the Paya River, a tributary of the Tuira River, and close to the Colombia–Panama border.

References

Corregimientos of Darién Province